The 1976 CONCACAF Under-20 Championship was held in Puerto Rico. It also served as qualification for the 1977 FIFA World Youth Championship.

Teams
The following teams entered the tournament:

Round 1

Group 1

Group 2

Group 3

Group 4

Round 2

Group A

Group B

Semifinals

Third place match

Final

Qualification to World Youth Championship
The two best performing teams qualified for the 1977 FIFA World Youth Championship.

External links
Results by RSSSF
Results by CONCACAF

CONCACAF Under-20 Championship
1976 in Puerto Rican sports
under
1976
1976 in youth association football